Morton Strait is the -long and -wide strait between Snow Island on the southwest and Rugged Island and Livingston Island on the northeast, in the South Shetland Islands, Antarctica. The Aim Rocks and Long Rock lie in the strait.

The feature was named on a chart by James Weddell, published in 1825, and is now established in international usage.

Location

Related features

Aim Rocks
Aim Rocks is a group of rocks lying east of Cape Timblón in the middle of Morton Strait. The name, given by the United Kingdom Antarctic Place-Names Committee in 1961, is descriptive; these rocks in line are a guide for safe passage through the southern entrance of Morton Strait. Interactive image.

Long Rock
The area was visited by early 19th century sealers operating on Byers Peninsula. The feature was named by Discovery Investigations personnel that charted Morton Strait in 1930–31. Interactive image.

Maps
 Chart of South Shetland including Coronation Island, &c. from the exploration of the sloop Dove in the years 1821 and 1822 by George Powell Commander of the same. Scale ca. 1:200000. London: Laurie, 1822.
 South Shetland Islands. Scale 1:200000 topographic map No. 5657. DOS 610 – W 62 60. Tolworth, UK, 1968.
 Islas Livingston y Decepción.  Mapa topográfico a escala 1:100000.  Madrid: Servicio Geográfico del Ejército, 1991.
 L.L. Ivanov et al., Antarctica: Livingston Island and Greenwich Island, South Shetland Islands (from English Strait to Morton Strait, with illustrations and ice-cover distribution), 1:100000 scale topographic map, Antarctic Place-names Commission of Bulgaria, Sofia, 2005
 L.L. Ivanov. Antarctica: Livingston Island and Greenwich, Robert, Snow and Smith Islands. Scale 1:120000 topographic map. Troyan: Manfred Wörner Foundation, 2010.  (First edition 2009. )
 Antarctic Digital Database (ADD). Scale 1:250000 topographic map of Antarctica. Scientific Committee on Antarctic Research (SCAR), 1993–2016.

References

 SCAR Composite Antarctic Gazetteer.

Straits of the South Shetland Islands
Bodies of water of Livingston Island